Winter Haven Area Transit is a bus system based in Winter Haven, Florida.  The system operates 9 of its own buses, and another 4 buses are provided for WHAT by the Citrus Connection.  There are 8 routes serving Winter Haven, Auburndale, Lakeland, Lake Alfred, Haines City, Lake Wales, Frostproof, Bartow, Dundee and Fort Meade.

Winter Haven Area Transit was started in 1999 by Lawrence Francis Murphy. It is a joint venture between the Board of County Commissioners of Polk County and the City of Winter Haven.

Route list
12 / Purple Line
Winter Haven to Lakeland
15 Winter Haven to Haines City
16x Haines City to Poinciana
17x Lake Wales to Haines City Express
18x Haines City to Davenport Express
19x Loughman Flex
22XW Bartow Express
25 Bartow/Fort Meade
27x Dundee/Eagle Ridge Mall
30 LegoLand
35 Frostproof/Eagle Ridge Mall
40/44 Southwest
50 Auburndale
60 Northeast Winter Haven
603 Southwest Poinciana

Bus fleet
1056-1059 | 2002 Gillig Phantom 30'
T96-T100  | 2010 Gillig BRT 30'
T116         | 2014 Eldorado EZ Rider II 30'

External links
 Winter Haven Area Transit

Bus transportation in Florida
Transportation in Polk County, Florida
Winter Haven, Florida
Transport infrastructure completed in 1999
1999 establishments in Florida